E. nana may refer to:
 Endolimax nana, an amoebozoa species found in the intestines of humans
 Ericameria nana, the dwarf goldenbush or rubberweed, a flowering shrub species
 Eurycea nana, the San Marcos salamander, a small species of aquatic, lungless salamander species native to the United States

Synonyms
 Ephedra nana, a synonym for Ephedra frustillata, the Patagonian ephedra, a plant species found in Patagonia

See also
 Nana (disambiguation)